Harold Bayley (25 May 1881 – 30 August 1943) was a cricketer. He played in fifteen first-class matches for British Guiana from 1901 to 1912.

See also
 List of Guyanese representative cricketers

References

External links
 

1881 births
1943 deaths
Cricketers from British Guiana
Sportspeople from Georgetown, Guyana